Emus hirtus is a species of rove beetle native to Southern and Central Europe. It is attracted to cow and horse manure.

References

Staphylininae
Beetles of Europe
Beetles described in 1758
Taxa named by Carl Linnaeus